Four ships of the French Navy have borne the name Iéna in honour of the Battle of Jena-Auerstedt:

 , a brig.
 , a 110-gun ship of the line launched in 1814, struck in 1864 and hulked until 1915.
 ,  launched in 1898 and sold for scrap in 1912.

French Navy ship names